Gregory M. Jones II (born October 5, 1988) is a former Canadian football linebacker who played for the Saskatchewan Roughriders of the Canadian Football League (CFL). He played college football for Michigan State University, and was a two-time All-American.  The New York Giants selected him in the sixth round of the 2011 NFL Draft, and he was a member of the Giants' Super Bowl championship team against the New England Patriots following the 2011 season.  He has also played for the NFL's Jacksonville Jaguars and Tennessee Titans, the CFL's Toronto Argonauts and the UFL's Las Vegas Locomotives.

Early years
Jones was born in Cincinnati, Ohio.  He attended Archbishop Moeller High School in Cincinnati. He was a two-time All-Greater Catholic League and PrepStar's All-Midwest Team selection for coach Bob Crable. As a junior in  2005, he had 13 tackles for losses, including three sacks. As a senior in 2006 he had 71 tackles, 23.5 tackles for loss and 11.5 sacks.

Jones was rated as a three-star recruit by Rivals.com and was ranked as the 34th best outside linebacker in his class. Scout.com had him ranked as the 24th best strong side linebacker.

College career
Jones received an athletic scholarship to attend Michigan State University, where he played for the Michigan State Spartans football team from 2007 to 2010.

2007
As a true freshman in 2007, Jones was named a first-team Freshman All-American by the Football Writers Association of America, Sporting News, CollegeFootballNews.com, Rivals.com and Scout.com. He led the Spartans with 78 tackles, becoming the first true freshman to lead the team in tackles since Dan Bass in 1976. The 78 tackles also ranked first among Big Ten freshmen. In his first career start, he had eight tackles and 1.5 tackles for losses against Northwestern. He also had four sacks.

2008
As a sophomore in 2008, Jones was named first-team All-Big Ten by the head coaches and second-team pick by the media. He was the first Spartan linebacker to earn All-Big ten first-team since Josh Thornhill in 2001. Jones was also named to Collegefootballnews.com's all sophomore team. He was awarded Michigan State's Outstanding Underclass Back award. He started all 13 games, again leading the team in tackles with 127 and had two sacks.

2009
As a junior in 2009, Jones recorded 154 tackles and nine sacks and was recognized as a consensus first-team All-American.  The 154 tackles led the team for the third straight year and was most in the Big Ten.  Jones was also the Big Ten Defensive Player of the Year, becoming the first Spartan to earn the honor. He earned first-team All-Big Ten for the second consecutive year.

2010
As a senior in 2010, Jones had 98 tackles, a sack and two interceptions.  He was named a first-team All-Big Ten selection for the third consecutive year, and was recognized as a unanimous first-team All-American.

Professional career

New York Giants
The New York Giants selected Jones in the sixth round (185th overall pick) of the 2011 NFL Draft. Jones became the Giants' starting middle linebacker after a season-ending injury to Jonathan Goff. He was waived on August 31, 2012.

Las Vegas Locomotive
Jones briefly played for the Las Vegas Locomotives of the UFL, but left when the team didn't pay him, before the league folded.

Jacksonville Jaguars
Jones signed with the Jacksonville Jaguars on November 12, 2012. Battling through an ankle injury all season, he was placed on season-ending injured reserve with a broken leg on December 24. He was released on May 6, 2013.

Tennessee Titans
On May 15, 2013, Jones signed with the Tennessee Titans. After missing several preseason games with an ankle injury, he was waived/injured by the Titans on August 26, 2013. On August 27, 2013, he cleared waivers and was placed on the Titans' reserve/injured list. On August 31, 2013, he was waived from reserve/injured with an injury settlement.

Toronto Argonauts
He signed with the Toronto Argonauts on March 27, 2014, choosing the Argonauts over the Montreal Alouettes.

Saskatchewan Roughriders
Jones was signed by the Saskatchewan Roughriders on February 10, 2016.

Personal life
Jones proposed to his girlfriend, Mandy Piechowski, a former Michigan State women's basketball player, on the field after the Giants won Super Bowl XLVI, and they married in July 2013. Their daughter Ava was born in 2014.
Jones graduated from Michigan State University in May 2015.

References

External links
Toronto Argonauts bio
Michigan State Spartans bio 

1988 births
Living people
All-American college football players
American football linebackers
Canadian football linebackers
American players of Canadian football
Jacksonville Jaguars players
Michigan State Spartans football players
New York Giants players
Players of American football from Cincinnati
Players of Canadian football from Cincinnati
Saskatchewan Roughriders players
Tennessee Titans players
Toronto Argonauts players